Field Gun Factory, Kanpur (FGK) is a factory located in Kanpur, India. Opening in 1979, it is the most recent member of the Advanced Weapons and Equipment India.

References
 

Defence companies of India
Companies based in Kanpur
1979 establishments in Uttar Pradesh
Indian companies established in 1979
Manufacturing companies established in 1979